Il filosofo di campagna (The Country Philosopher) is a dramma giocoso per musica in 3 acts by composer Baldassare Galuppi. The opera uses an Italian language libretto by Carlo Goldoni. The work premiered at the Teatro San Samuele in Venice on 26 October 1754.

Il filosofo di campagna, which has been defined a "masterly opera", obtained a great success, with many performances throughout Europe.

Roles

Synopsis

Tritemio wants his daughter Eugenia to marry Nardo, a rich farmer, known as "the Philosopher", but Eugenia is in love with the nobleman Rinaldo. Lesbina, housemaid of Tritemio, in order to avoid that Nardo meets Eugenia, takes the place of the girl. Nardo, who has never seen Eugenia before, ends up falling in love with Lesbina, convinced that she is the true daughter of Tritemio.

After a series of misunderstandings Nardo learns of the true identity of Lesbina, but he accepts the housemaid all the same and remains in love with her.

Lesbina persuades Tritemio that she wants to marry him and a notary is called. When the notary arrives, without Tritemio knowing it, a double wedding is celebrated, between Nardo and Lesbina and between Rinaldo and Eugenia. Tritemio has to resign himself to the situation, but he finds his consolation marrying Lena, a niece of Nardo.

Recordings

References
Notes

Sources

Further reading
 Piero Paci, "Note sul ritrovamento di una edizione sconosciuta de il Filosofo di campagna di Goldoni (Genova, Bernardo Tarigo, 1756)", in Teca – Testimonianze Editoria Cultura Arte, no. 5, March 2014, Pàtron Editore Bologna, pp. 85–103.

External links
Italian libretto

1754 operas
Drammi giocosi
Italian-language operas
Operas
Operas by Baldassare Galuppi
Libretti by Carlo Goldoni